Anna Aleksandrovna Kochetova (born 4 May 1987) is a Russian handball player for HC Astrakhanochka and the Russian national team.

At the 2009–10 EHF Women's Champions League Kochetova placed third on the list of top scorers.

References

Living people
1987 births
Russian female handball players
Sportspeople from Volgograd
21st-century Russian women